The 1986 All-Pro Team is composed of the National Football League players that were named to the Associated Press, Newspaper Enterprise Association, Pro Football Writers Association, Pro Football Weekly, and The Sporting News in 1986. Both first and second teams are listed for the AP and NEA teams. These are the five teams that are included in Total Football II: The Official Encyclopedia of the National Football League.  In 1986 the AP chose two defensive tackles (one a nose-tackle) rather than two defensive tackles and one nose tackles as they had done since 1981. The Pro Football Writers Association returned to a 4-3 format for their 1986 defense.

Teams

Key
 AP = Associated Press first-team All-Pro
 AP-2 = Associated Press second-team All-Pro
 NEA = Newspaper Enterprise Association first-team All-Pro team
 NEA-2 = Newspaper Enterprise Association second-team All-Pro team
 PFW = Pro Football Weekly All-Pro team
 PFWA = Pro Football Writers Association All-NFL
 TSN = The Sporting News All-Pro

References

Pro-Football-Reference.com

All-Pro Teams
Allpro